"While You Wait for the Others" is a song by Brooklyn-based indie rock band Grizzly Bear, and the second single from the band's third studio album, Veckatimest. The song was released as a single on August 31, 2009.

Accolades
"While You Wait for the Others" was ranked #334 in Pitchfork Media's Top 500 Tracks of the 2000s 

Upon release, Pitchfork gave the song their first ever 10/10 review, stating that the track "proves what Grizzly Bear are capable of when they try and meet the pop-inclined listener halfway."

Michael McDonald collaboration
Michael McDonald, of the Doobie Brothers, performs lead vocals on the single's B-side - the same track with the lead vocals replaced by McDonald's. McDonald states that Grizzly Bear's songs are "alluring and interesting. So when they mentioned to me about doing this, I said absolutely."

Speaking to Pitchfork Media about the collaboration, bassist Chris Taylor commented,

Video
A video for "While You Wait for the Others" was released on September 11, 2009. The video was directed by Sean Pecknold, brother of Fleet Foxes' Robin Pecknold.

Track listing

References

External links
 Single synopsis at Warp Records

2009 singles
Grizzly Bear (band) songs
Warp (record label) singles
2009 songs